The statue of John Henry Newman is an outdoor sculpture of the English cardinal, oratorian, and theologian of the same name by Léon-Joseph Chavalliaud, installed outside Brompton Oratory in London, United Kingdom.

References

External links
 
 John Henry Cardinal Newman – Brompton Road, London, UK at Waymarking

Grade II listed buildings in the Royal Borough of Kensington and Chelsea
Monuments and memorials in London
Outdoor sculptures in London
Sculptures of men in the United Kingdom
Statues in London